Eucalyptus tintinnans, commonly known as the ringing gum or Hills salmon gum, is a small to medium-sized tree that is endemic to the Top End of the Northern Territory. It has smooth, colourful bark, round to triangular leaves, flower buds usually in groups of seven, white flowers and conical to hemispherical fruit.

Description
It is often deciduous by the end of the dry season. It has smooth orange to cream-coloured new bark that later becomes salmon pink and finally grey shortly before it is shed. Flowering occurs from July to September and the flowers are white.

Taxonomy and naming
Ringing gum was first formally described in 1934 by William Blakely and Maxwell Ralph Jacobs in Blakely's book A Key to the Eucalypts, and it was given the name Eucalyptus platyphylla var. tintinnans. In 1988, Lawrie Johnson and Ken Hill raised the variety to species status as Eucalyptus tintinnans. The specific epithet (tintinnans) is derived from Latin and refers to the ringing sound that hollow trees of this species often make when struck with an axe.

Distribution and habitat
Eucalyptus tintinnans grows on sandy soil in hilly country or on low stony hills from near Stapleton to the Kakadu National Park and Katherine Gorge in the Top End.

Conservation status
This eucalypt is classified as "least concern" under the Northern Territory Government Territory Parks and Wildlife Conservation Act.

See also
List of Eucalyptus species

References

Trees of Australia
tintinnans
Myrtales of Australia
Flora of the Northern Territory
Plants described in 1934